The International Semantic Web Conference (ISWC) is a series of academic conferences and the premier international forum for the Semantic Web, Linked Data and Knowledge Graph Community. Here, scientists, industry specialists, and practitioners meet to discuss the future of practical, scalable, user-friendly, and game changing solutions. Its proceedings are published in the Lecture Notes in Computer Science by Springer-Verlag.

Overview

References 

Web-related conferences
Artificial intelligence conferences